Propylbarbital (Propal, Propanal, Proponal), also known as 5,5-dipropylbarbituric acid, is a barbiturate derivative used as a hypnotic drug.

References 

Barbiturates
Hypnotics
GABAA receptor positive allosteric modulators